The surname Hobley, or derivatives of it, can be found on early census rolls in Cornwall which were taken by the early Kings of Britain to determine the rate of taxation of their subjects.

Meaning
A suggestion as to the meaning of the name "Hobley" includes the meaning "The little people from the meadow", derived from a combination of the words "hob" and "ley". From middle English, the word "hob" means a hobgoblin, sprite, or elf. The word "ley" means a grassy meadow.

Some people believe that Hob is a derivative of Robert and that the name Hobley suggests Robert's path or field. From old English, the name "Robert" means bright and famous.

Pronunciation
Despite the spelling, the name is pronounced with an "obb" not an "obe". This is probably because it is a combination of two words, and the pronunciation has not changed as the words have combined.

Ancestry
All families with the surname Hobley from around the world today appear to have ancestry which links back to Warwickshire.

Notable Hobleys

C.W. Hobley, pioneering Kenyan colonial administrator
Hannah Hobley, actress.
John William Dixon Hobley, former Attorney General of Hong Kong
Tina Hobley, actress

Surnames